Martin Černáček (born 9 November 1979) is a Slovak football defender who currently plays for FC Neded.

Spartak Myjava
He made his Corgoň Liga debut for Spartak Myjava against MŠK Žilina on 13 July 2012.

External links
Spartak Myjava profile

References

1979 births
Living people
Slovak footballers
Association football defenders
FC Spartak Trnava players
Spartak Myjava players
Slovak Super Liga players
Sportspeople from Trnava